Slapstick (Steve Harmon)  is a fictional superhero appearing in American comic books published by Marvel Comics. He resembles an animated clown and has the abilities of a slapstick cartoon character, such as one from Looney Tunes, including warping reality to match that of an animated cartoon.

Publication history

Slapstick debuted November 1992 in The Awesome Slapstick #1 and was created by writer Len Kaminski and artist James Fry. Afterwards, he made a notable appearance with the New Warriors in Marvel Comics Presents and was unseen until a "Civil War" cameo in She-Hulk. He also regularly appeared in Avengers: The Initiative as a recruit.

In 2015, Slapstick became a regular member of the Mercs for Money series. In 2017, he got a second solo series created by Reilly Brown, Fred Van Lente and Diego Olortegui that lasted six issues.

In Slapstick Vol. 2 Issue 4, his full name was revealed to be Steven Winsor McCay Harmon, his middle name being a reference to the animator Winsor McCay.

Fictional character biography
Slapstick was originally junior high school class clown Steve Harmon, from New York City. In a plan to get back at his archrival Winston, Steve dresses as a clown to blend into the crowd at a strange new carnival.

Before Steve could enact his plan, Winston and his date, Heather, were kidnapped by several clowns. Steve picks up a mallet as a weapon and follows them. The group enters the carnival funhouse and enters a portal disguised as a mirror. As it was closing, Steve follows.

At the moment of entry, an energy burst races across Steve's world, alerting the senses of several beings, such as Doctor Strange, Silver Surfer, Spider-Man and Howard the Duck.

His molecules stretch across 3741 dimensions and Steve ends up in the realm of the Scientist Supreme of Dimension X (who resembles Groucho Marx). The scientist helps Steve master his new form, a body composed of living unstable molecules dubbed Electroplasm. This essentially makes him a living cartoon character. The scientist, who had been ousted from his position by the Overlord, theorizes that Steve had come to his new form because he was slightly out of synch when entering the funhouse portal.

Using his new powers and a map the scientist had, Steve freed many captive Earthlings from the evil Clowns from Dimension X and their ruler, the Overlord. It is learned that this is what the scientist had intended all along. The Overlord's plan had been to brainwash Earthlings enough so their belief would be sufficient to give Overlord whatever he desired. The Overlord's plans were foiled when the belief that held up his castle gave way as the humans regained their right minds. The castle crashes. The captured humans run to the portal, followed quickly by the monstrous clowns. Steve destroys the mirror, eradicating the clown's influence on this reality.

Minutes afterward, Steve is found by his best friend, Mike Peterson, who agrees to assist him.

Other enemies
Steve has other villains to confront: a Punisher copycat called the Overkiller attacks Steve because he thinks he is a mutant (the mutant was Dr. Denton). The two fight in a mall, destroying most of it. Steve ends the fight by literally kissing Overkiller and then walloping him while the man reacts with disgust. Spider-Man assists with the battle.  Slapstick also battled the super smart, preteen Dr. Denton and Teddy, and rescued Barbara Halsey. There was also a homeless man, the Neutron Bum, with the power to cause explosions. Despite the gathering of dozens of superheroes willing and planning to fight the man (including Daredevil, Ghost Rider, Speedball, the Fantastic Four, the Avengers and the New Warriors), Slapstick simply neutralizes the situation by getting Neutron Bum what he had been yelling for all along — a cup of coffee — and then blindsiding the man from behind while he's drinking it.

He is a friend of Speedball of the New Warriors and is described as "The hero who doesn't fight crime but rather plays cruel tricks on it."

Later, Slapstick teamed up with the New Warriors to fight Dr. Yesterday, partly because doing so would impress women. It has been established that at some point prior to Justice and Firestar leaving the New Warriors to become Avengers, Slapstick and Ultra Girl are made official members of the Warriors and given communicators, after helping the team stop a Badoon invasion.

Civil War
During the Civil War storyline, Slapstick helps the surviving members of the New Warriors find Hindsight Lad, the young man and former Warrior responsible for outing the secret identities of past Warriors and allies to the public. LaFroyge was stopped, arrested by the authorities, before Slapstick's identity was made public.

The Initiative
Slapstick is later seen on the bus of new recruits arriving at Camp Hammond as part of the Initiative training program. He is later seen, with other heroes, confronting Ben Grimm as part of a training mission.

Slapstick and other Camp Hammond members are sent out as crowd control when the Hulk and his Warbound crew leads an attack on New York. He is assigned morale support for the evacuating citizens under command of the Avenger Triathlon. A fellow recruit, Rage leads a rebellion against the crowd support mission in order to go confront the Hulk. Slapstick joins in. His team is swiftly defeated by the Hulk's forces.

The recruits are imprisoned by Hulk's forces in Madison Square Garden and neutralized with power-sapping technology. They are rescued by black ops forces associated with the Camp.

Later it is Slapstick who attacks and almost kills Gauntlet out of loyalty to the New Warriors, in retaliation for Gauntlet's use of the team's name as an insult.<ref>Avengers: The Initiative #6 (2007)</ref> He has since tried to admit this to his teammates but is always comically interrupted. He later comes in possession of a device containing the memory and personality of KIA, the villainous clone of Michael Van Patrick, and decides to keep it for further use.

Slapstick and several other former New Warriors have recently been recruited by Justice and apparently deserted from the Initiative, after Justice finds evidence of shady activities within the organization.  After helping stop KIA's rampage, this new group officially quits the Initiative, intending to act as a form of independent oversight for the program. As legally registered heroes, they are free to act unless they break the law while doing so. When asked to change to his less conspicuous normal form, Slapstick admits that he has not done so since joining the Initiative, and claims that the mechanism that activates the change no longer works.

He later returned to Camp Hammond with the team, now calling themselves the New Warriors again, and battled Ragnarok, the cyborg clone of Thor. Slapstick is also a noted presence in the multi-hero effort to rebuild New York after the events of World War Hulk.

Fear Itself
During the Fear Itself storyline, Slapstick appears at a meeting held by Prodigy regarding magical hammers that have crashed into the earth. He later joins forces with other heroes to battle the Worthy.

Mercs for Money
When Deadpool founded his Mercs for Money, he employed the services of Slapstick, among numerous other vigilantes, to pose as him in order to extend his reach across the globe. While striving to do good, like his new colleagues, Slapstick has severe emotional problems due to an inability to change back to his human form.

Powers and abilities
As Slapstick, Steve Harmon's body is made out of Electroplasm after exposure to an unknown alien device, which makes him indestructible. Any damage that he takes can be immediately shaken off, as he possesses superhuman durability and virtually unlimited physical malleability in the manner of an animated slapstick cartoon character. Slapstick also possesses superhuman agility and reflexes. It has been shown that the molecular bonds of the Electroplasm can be disrupted by a counter charge of a specific frequency of energy, reducing Slapstick to an immobile "puddle"; however, another energy charge can restore him to "normal".

In addition, Slapstick gets temporarily stronger when electrocuted. However, he must have a consistent feed of electricity to maintain this strength.

Slapstick's gloves also possess alien technology. His left glove has a transformation inducer that allows him to transform to and from Slapstick to his normal Steve Harmon form. His right glove is a materializer that contains an extra-dimensionally sub-spacial storage pocket, which functions similar to cartoon hammerspace, and allows him to store items seemingly nowhere. He can access these items by making a special gesture with that hand, though to anyone observing it would appear he is pulling them out of thin air. He usually keeps a large cartoon-ish mallet in this space. Recent accounts have shown similar pockets in the pants of his costume.  Objects stored in these pockets are undetectable by conventional means; for example, Slapstick carried his New Warriors communicator, left forgotten in a pants pocket, into Camp Hammond without any of the base's security measures detecting it.

Slapstick is an experienced practical joker, with a highly developed bizarre sense of humor.

It has been noted that Steve Harmon has no genitalia in his Slapstick form, much to his disappointment.

Other versions
Mutant X
In the alternate universe of Mutant X (Earth-1298 in the Marvel Comics Multiverse), Slapstick was a member of a group of supernatural heroes called the Lethal Legion (no connection to the Earth-616 villain group). Little is known about this version of the character, and why he joined the team. He was killed by the Goblin Queen, disguised as the Beyonder.

In other media
Slapstick makes a cameo appearance in Deadpool's ending in Ultimate Marvel vs. Capcom 3''.

Collected editions

References

External links 
 Slapstick at Marvel.com
 

Comics characters introduced in 1992
Fictional characters from New Jersey
Fictional characters who break the fourth wall
Fictional characters who can stretch themselves
Fictional characters with superhuman durability or invulnerability
Fictional clowns
Fictional hammer fighters
Fictional pranksters
Marvel Comics characters who are shapeshifters
Marvel Comics characters who can move at superhuman speeds
Marvel Comics characters with accelerated healing
Marvel Comics characters with superhuman strength
Marvel Comics mutates
Marvel Comics superheroes
Marvel Comics titles
Parody superheroes
Teenage superheroes